Michal Hamuľak (born 26 November 1990) is a Slovak football forward.

Club career

FC Slovan Liberec
He made his SYNOT liga debut for FC Slovan Liberec against SK Dynamo České Budějovice on 27 July 2014.

References

External links
 FC Slovan Liberec profile
 
 Eurofotbal profile
 MFK Zemplín Michalovce profile
 Futbalnet profile

1990 births
Living people
Slovak footballers
Association football forwards
ŠK Futura Humenné players
MŠK Novohrad Lučenec players
MFK Vranov nad Topľou players
MFK Zemplín Michalovce players
FC Slovan Liberec players
FC Lokomotíva Košice players
Partizán Bardejov players
Czech First League players
Expatriate footballers in the Czech Republic
Sportspeople from Humenné
2. Liga (Slovakia) players